Lowell Airport was an airfield operational in the mid-20th century in Lowell, Massachusetts. The airport hosted the Moth Aircraft Corp. of Lowell, where 179 de Havilland Moth planes were manufactured under license between 1929 and 1931.

References

Transportation in Lowell, Massachusetts
Defunct airports in Massachusetts
Airports in Middlesex County, Massachusetts
Buildings and structures in Lowell, Massachusetts